Godshill station was at Godshill on the Isle of Wight on the Newport, Godshill & St Lawrence Railway, later the Isle of Wight Central Railway.

History
It opened on 20 July 1897 as a single platform station with a small goods siding and this layout remained until closure. The station was reduced to the status of an unstaffed halt in 1927.

The station was not a financial success and never brought a large income to managers. There was some agricultural traffic, notably milk, and a few local passengers until the bus services became well established.

Stationmasters
William Froud ca. 1898 ca. 1901
Harry Alfred Phillips ca. 1910 ca. 1911
Frederick William Henry Stay 1917 - 1923

Location 
The station was surrounded by fields but at the same time ½ mile from the centre of the village. This is still the case today. The platform still stands and the station buildings have been converted into private dwellings.

Other stations on the branch 

The other stations on the Ventnor West branch were:

 Merstone (where the branch joined the Newport-Sandown line)
 Whitwell
 St. Lawrence (the original terminus of the line from 1897 to 1900)
 Ventnor West

External links 
 Godshill station on navigable 1946 O. S. map
 Subterranea Britannica: SB-Sites: Godshill Station

References

Disused railway stations on the Isle of Wight
Former Isle of Wight Central Railway stations
Railway stations in Great Britain opened in 1897
Railway stations in Great Britain closed in 1952